is a railway station in the town of Fusō, Aichi Prefecture,  Japan, operated by Meitetsu.

Lines

Station layout
The station has two island platforms connected by an elevated station building built over the tracks and platforms. The station is staffed.

Platforms

Adjacent stations

|-
!colspan=5|Nagoya Railroad

Station history
The station name was changed to its present name on February 1, 1948. A new station building was completed in February 1994, and its platforms were reorganized into their present configuration.

Surrounding area
 Fusō Town Hall

See also
 List of Railway Stations in Japan

References

External links

  Official web page 

Railway stations in Japan opened in 1912
Railway stations in Aichi Prefecture
Stations of Nagoya Railroad
Fusō, Aichi